Viburnum cassinoides is a species of shrub in the viburnum family, Viburnaceae. It is native to eastern North America.

References

cassinoides
Flora of North America